The 2020 NWSL Challenge Cup was a tournament during the 2020 National Women's Soccer League season to mark the league's return to action from the COVID-19 pandemic. It was the first professional team sports event to return to play in United States.

Originally planned as a one-off tournament, the NWSL announced that the Challenge Cup would return in the 2021 NWSL season as a league cup competition.

Format 

The Challenge Cup was originally planned as a 25-game tournament featuring all nine NWSL clubs. However, on June 22, the Orlando Pride withdrew following six positive COVID-19 tests among players and four more among non-playing staff. On June 23, the NWSL released the revised schedule of an 8-team, 23-game tournament. 

On June 22, the NWSL announced the full rules and regulations for the tournament. Each team would play four games in a preliminary round, with eight teams advancing to a single-elimination knockout bracket. Teams would be ranked by points in the preliminary round, with three points for a win and one for a draw, and the rankings used to determine seeding in the knockout bracket.

Effects of the COVID-19 pandemic 
To lessen the impact of fixture congestion caused by the COVID-19 pandemic, NWSL clubs were permitted to roster up to 28 players (a temporary increase by two), to have the full roster available for substitutions during a game, and to make up to five substitutions in accordance with temporary rules and regulations from the International Football Association Board. There would be no extra time; any games in the knockout round that were tied after regulation would go straight to a penalty shoot-out. Final tournament rosters had to be submitted by June 21.

In order to hold the tournament as safely as possible, all games were held behind closed doors in two stadiums near Salt Lake City, Utah. All teams were quarantined during the entirety of the tournament in a so-called "NWSL village" with all housing provided by Dell Loy Hansen, owner of Utah Royals FC. All players, officials, and essential staff members were tested for the coronavirus 48 hours before departure for Utah and remained subject to regular testing, temperature reading, and symptom review throughout the tournament.

Squads

NWSL teams were required to submit finalized rosters to participate in the 2020 NWSL Challenge Cup on June 21. Roster sizes were required to be a minimum of 22 players and maximum of 28 players (24 senior players + 4 supplemental players) and contain at least three goalkeepers. Only players listed on that final roster are permitted to participate in the tournament. International players already under contract by NWSL teams but not participating in the tournament do not count towards the roster limit. Furthermore, teams could sign a maximum of 4 players they had the rights to but were not yet under contract to short-term contracts lasting the duration of the tournament. Short-term loans from teams outside the NWSL were also permissible. 

Player participation for the tournament was optional. The league allowed players to opt out without being in breach of contract, keeping all contracts, housing, insurance and other benefits guaranteed regardless of participation in the tournament.

Squads were announced on June 23. OL Reign announced that United States international Megan Rapinoe had decided to opt out, while Julia Ashley and Leah Pruitt were unavailable due to long-term injuries. Two more U.S. internationals, Tobin Heath (Portland Thorns FC) and Christen Press (Utah Royals FC), announced their decisions to opt out. Sky Blue FC omitted U.S. internationals Carli Lloyd and Mallory Pugh, as well as Caprice Dydasco, all recovering from injuries. Merritt Mathias was unavailable due to a long-term injury for the North Carolina Courage, while Chicago Red Stars were missing Alyssa Mautz and Arin Wright due to a long-term injury and maternity leave respectively. All of the remaining teams — including the Orlando Pride, who withdrew from the tournament — named their full rosters.

Preliminary round

Draw 
The draw for the preliminary round was held on June 1, 2020, 12:00 ET, and streamed live on CBS Sports HQ. The nine NWSL teams were drawn randomly into nine slots, which determined each team's four-game schedule for the preliminary round. After the draw concluded, the NWSL released the full schedule of the preliminary round to be played at Zions Bank Stadium.

The Orlando Pride withdrew from the tournament on June 22, 2020, after receiving multiple positive COVID-19 test results among the team's players and staff. One day later, the NWSL accordingly released a revised tournament schedule.

Standings

Tiebreakers 
The initial determining factor for a team's position in the standings is most points earned, with three points earned for a win, one point for a draw, and zero points for a loss. If two or more teams are equal on points after completion of the preliminary round, the following criteria shall be applied to determine team rankings:

 Head-to-Head (only if two teams are tied and they've played each other).
 Superior goal difference in all preliminary matches.
 Greatest number of goals scored in all preliminary matches.
 Lowest team conduct score relating to the number of yellow and red cards obtained, where only one of the below point totals shall be applied to a player in a single match:
 yellow card: 1 point;
 indirect red card (as a result of two yellow cards): 3 points;
 direct red card: 4 points;
 yellow card and direct red card: 5 points.
 Drawing of lots by the NWSL.

Schedule 
All game times are listed in MDT.

Matchday 1

Matchday 2

Matchday 3

Matchday 4

Matchday 5

Matchday 6

Matchday 7

Matchday 8

Knockout round 
In the knockout round, if a game was level at the end of 90 minutes of normal playing time, there would be no extra time and the winners would be determined by a penalty shoot-out.

Bracket 

All game times are listed in MDT.

Quarter-finals

Semi-finals

Championship

Statistics

Goalscorers

Assists

Discipline 
A player would be automatically suspended for the next match for the following offences:
 Receiving a red card (red card suspensions may be extended for serious offences);
 Receiving two yellow cards in two matches; yellow cards expire after the completion of the quarter-finals;
 Direct red card suspensions are carried forward to future NWSL regular season matches, but indirect red card suspensions will not be carried forward to any future matches.

No suspensions were served during the tournament.

Awards 
The following awards were given at the conclusion of the tournament: The MVP (most outstanding player as voted by the media and sponsored by Budweiser), Golden Boot (top scorer), Golden Glove (best goalkeeper as voted by the media and sponsored by Verizon), NWSL Future Legend (the top-performing player in their first season with the NWSL), and Best XI (the best 11-players as voted by the players, media, fans, and GMs/coaches, and presented by Google).

Best XI

Fan-voted awards 
 Play of the Tournament:  Lindsey Horan, POR
 Save of the Tournament:  Britt Eckerstrom, POR

Broadcasting 
In accordance with the broadcast deals signed by the NWSL at the start of the 2020 season, both the tournament opener and final aired on CBS. All other games were broadcast live on the CBS All Access subscription service in the U.S. and Canada and re-aired on CBS Sports Network. International fans were able to stream the full tournament on Twitch.

References

External links 

2020
2020 in American soccer leagues
2020 National Women's Soccer League season
NWSL
NWSL Challenge